Torodora chumphonica is a moth in the family Lecithoceridae. It was described by Kyu-Tek Park in 2002. It is found in Thailand.

The wingspan is about 15 mm. The forewings are brown with inconspicuous discal spots.

Etymology
The species name is derived from Chun phon in Thailand, the type locality.

References

Moths described in 2002
Torodora